The ARY Film Award for Best Music is an ARY Film Award that is awarded each year to the best film score that is substantial body of music in the form of dramatic underscoring written specifically for the film by the submitting composer.

History
The Best Music category originates with the 1st ARY Film Awards ceremony since 2014. This category has been given to the Best Music Composer for his/her work for the films of previous year to the ceremony held by Jury selection.

Category
Best Music and Best Background Score are two identical but are different form of music composing that is provided to film. Background Score is the music that is written for the film songs, while film Music also share same theme but generally regarded as the film main theme music. Both branch of music composing are done by a music composer.

Winners and Nominees 

As of first ceremony total of five music composers were nominated, while Sahir Ali Bagg was the only music composer who was the winner of Best Background Score in Technical category and bags the nomination in this category too.

2010s

References

External links 

 ARY Film Awards Official website

ARY Film Awards